The Ezra and Abigail Shomaker House, at 194 W. 400 North in Manti, Utah, was listed on the National Register of Historic Places in 2014.

It is a one-and-a-half-story stone and brick house with Greek Revival and Victorian Eclectic style.  It was built in three phases between 1866 and 1895.

It is also known as the Orlondo & Chelnishcia Shomaker House.

References

National Register of Historic Places in Sanpete County, Utah
Greek Revival architecture in Utah
Victorian architecture in Utah
Houses completed in 1866